Allan Lee Woodrow (16 April 1886 – 29 March 1966) was a Canadian Senator.

Born in Saint John, New Brunswick, he was appointed to the Canadian Senate on 19 May 1953 on the recommendation of Louis St-Laurent.  A Liberal, he represented the senatorial division of Toronto Centre for the province of Ontario until his resignation on 15 March 1966.

References 
 

1886 births
1966 deaths
Canadian senators from Ontario
Liberal Party of Canada senators